Leo Patrick Engel  (May 18, 1932 – December 5, 2022) was an American politician from the state of Nebraska. A resident of South Sioux City, Engel served four terms in the Nebraska Legislature, from 1993 to 2009.

Engel was born on May 18, 1932, in South Sioux City. He graduated from the South Sioux City Public Schools and the University of Nebraska-Lincoln.  He served in the U.S. Air Force as an intelligence officer. He served on the school boards of St. Michael's and of South Sioux City, and as a Dakota county commissioner.

Engel was appointed to represent the 17th District in the Nebraska State Legislature on September 1, 1993, replacing Kurt Hohenstein. He was then elected to the seat in 1994, and reelected in 1996, 2000, and 2004.

In the Legislature, Engel chaired the Executive Board and the Reference Committee, and sat on the Appropriations Committee and the Legislative Performance Audit Committee.

Engel died on December 5, 2022, at the age of 90.

References

 

1932 births
2022 deaths
County supervisors and commissioners in Nebraska
University of Nebraska–Lincoln alumni
Nebraska Democrats
Nebraska Republicans
Nebraska state senators
People from South Sioux City, Nebraska
Military personnel from Nebraska
School board members in Nebraska